David Ijaha (born 17 February 1990) is an English footballer who plays as a midfielder or defender currently for Cray Wanderers.

Career

Early career
Ijaha was at his local Chelsea academy for three years as a youngster, being released at the age of 15. Having earned a place at an England Schoolboy training camp he met up with Kyle Bennett who introduced him to Wolverhampton Wanderers, where he spent two seasons playing for the U18 side and the reserves, before being released.

Non-League career
After a spell out of the game, Ijaha joined Harrow Borough in August 2010 and then followed his manager David Howell to Southern Premier Division St Albans City, where he was made captain. He signed for National League South side Tonbridge Angels in December 2013. Following Tonbridge's relegation, Ijaha joined Hayes & Yeading United at the start of the 2014–2015 season, where he had been a long term target of manager Phil Babb. However, he soon moved to National League South rivals Whitehawk where he spent two seasons.

Plymouth Argyle
At the start of the 2016–2017 season, Ijaha was invited down to Home Park for a trial by Plymouth Argyle's assistant manager Craig Brewster, who had previously coached in Sussex at Whitehawk. Ijaha impressed enough to be offered a contract  and he made his Football League debut at the age of 27, playing for Plymouth Argyle in a 3–0 loss against Luton Town on 6 August 2016. After struggling with a long-term injury, Ijaha was released at the end of the 2016–17 season having made three league appearances.

Later career
Ijaha had a short spell with National League South club Wealdstone at the beginning of the 2017–18 season, before rejoining Whitehawk and being appointed captain in September.

After a season at Welling United in 2018–19 and another season at Dulwich Hamlet in 2019–20, Ijaha joined league rivals Dartford for the 2020–21 season. He re-joined Dartford towards the end of the 2021–22 season before going out on loan to former-side Whitehawk.

On September 16 2022, Ijaha signed for Cray Wanderers.

Personal life
Ijaha was educated at St Thomas More School in Chelsea.

Career statistics

References

1990 births
Living people
Footballers from Greater London
Association football midfielders
English footballers
Chelsea F.C. players
Wolverhampton Wanderers F.C. players
Harrow Borough F.C. players
St Albans City F.C. players
Tonbridge Angels F.C. players
Hayes & Yeading United F.C. players
Whitehawk F.C. players
Plymouth Argyle F.C. players
Wealdstone F.C. players
Isthmian League players
Southern Football League players
National League (English football) players
English Football League players
Welling United F.C. players
Dulwich Hamlet F.C. players
Dartford F.C. players
Cray Wanderers F.C. players
Black British sportspeople